Pothos longipes is a climbing plant of the warmer rainforests of eastern Australia. Distributed from Boorganna Nature Reserve in the Mid North Coast of New South Wales to tropical Queensland. This plant is mostly found growing on trunks of trees. An attractive plant with interesting flowers and bright red fruit.

Description 
A slender, glossy leaved climber or hemi-epiphyte. Leaves 1.5 to 5 cm long, 5 to 15 mm wide. Leaves flattened, appearing constricted with an apparent wasp waist in the middle of the apparent leaf at the point where the flattened petiole meets the leaf blade itself.

Flowers form in late spring to early summer, being greenish or purple, featuring a lanceolate shaped spathe, 25 mm long. The spadix is yellowish and cylindrical, up to 6 cm long. Flowers usually solitary, on a 5 cm stem. The fruit is a red drupe, 8 to 13 mm long. Germination from fresh seed is not particularly difficult.

References 

 

Pothoideae
Flora of New South Wales
Flora of Queensland
Epiphytes

ru:Pothos